The Maithili Wikipedia is the Maithili language version of Wikipedia, run by the Wikimedia Foundation. The site was launched on November 6, 2014. Today, Maithili is written in the Devanagari script  and the site uses the same. Maithili is an Indo-Aryan language spoken in the Bihar and Jharkhand states of India and is one of the 22 recognised Indian languages which is also spoken in the eastern Terai of Nepal and is the second most prevalent language of Nepal. It is also one of the 122 recognized Nepalese languages.

History
The process of creating a Maithili language Wikipedia started in 2008.

Users and editors

See also 
 Bhojpuri Wikipedia
 Hindi Wikipedia
 Tamil Wikipedia
 Telugu Wikipedia

References

External links 
 
 Wikipedia.org multilingual portal
 Wikimedia Foundation

Wikipedias by language
Internet properties established in 2014